Sungor or Asungor is an ethnic group in Chad and Sudan (West Darfur). They speak Assangori, a Nilo-Saharan language. They numbered at least 60,000 according to a 1996 source.

Culture 
The Sungor are mainly pastoralists who raise goats, camels, and cattle. They also engage in subsistence agriculture.

Majority of the Sungor are Muslim.

References 

Ethnic groups in Sudan
Ethnic groups in Chad